"Let the Good Times Roll" is a jump blues song recorded in 1946 by Louis Jordan and his Tympany Five.  A mid-tempo twelve-bar blues, the song became a blues standard and one of Jordan's best-known songs.

Composition
"Let the Good Times Roll" is "Louis Jordan's buoyant invitation to party":

The song was written by Sam Theard, a New Orleans-born blues singer and songwriter, and was co-credited to Fleecie Moore, Jordan's wife.  Theard first showed Jordan the song in 1942, while playing in Chicago clubs. The tune developed over the years until Jordan recorded it in New York City in June 1946.

Charts and recognition
"Let the Good Times Roll" reached number two in the Billboard R&B chart in 1947.  Its flip side, "Ain't Nobody Here but Us Chickens", was the top number one record of 1947 — both songs spent nearly six months on the chart.  In 2009, the song was acknowledged with a Grammy Hall of Fame Award. Jordan and the Tympany Five performed the song in the 1947 film Reet, Petite, and Gone, although the studio recording rather than a live performance is used in the soundtrack.

The Blues Foundation added the song to its Hall of Fame in 2013 in the "Classic of Blues Recording — Singles or Album Tracks" category. The induction announcement noted that the song "became a standard show opener for countless blues artists over the years, from B.B. King to Koko Taylor". "Let the Good Times Roll" has also been identified as inspiring "Come On" by Earl King and "Bon Ton Roulet" by Clifton Chenier.

References

1946 songs
Louis Jordan songs
Ray Charles songs
B.B. King songs
Grammy Hall of Fame Award recipients
Songs written by Sam Theard